This is a list of Danish television related events from 2011.

Events
26 February - A Friend in London are selected to represent Denmark at the 2011 Eurovision Song Contest with their song "New Tomorrow". They are selected to be the thirty-ninth Danish Eurovision entry during Dansk Melodi Grand Prix held at the Ballerup Super Arena in Ballerup.
25 March - 15-year-old Sarah Skaalum Jørgensen wins the fourth season of X Factor.
25 November - Freestyle skier Sophie Fjellvang-Sølling and her partner Silas Holst win the eighth season of Vild med dans.

Debuts

26 November - Voice – Danmarks største stemme (2011–present)

Television shows

1990s
Hvem vil være millionær? (1999–present)

2000s
Vild med dans (2005–present)
X Factor (2008–present)

Ending this year

Births

Deaths

See also
 2011 in Denmark